FEMS Microbiology Letters is a peer-reviewed scientific journal covering all aspects of microbiology, including virology. The journal was established in 1977 and is published by Oxford University Press on behalf of the Federation of European Microbiological Societies. The Editor-in-Chief has been Dr Rich Boden of the University of Plymouth since 2014. 

The journal gave rise to separate titles over the years but retained the subject areas of ecology and medical microbiology and indeed review articles as part of its scope nonetheless:
FEMS Microbiology Immunology (1988), which was retitled FEMS Immunology and Medical Microbiology (1993) and is now Pathogens and Disease (2013).
FEMS Microbiology Reviews (1985)
FEMS Microbiology Ecology (1985)

Abstracting and indexing
The journal is indexed and abstracted in the following bibliographic databases:

According to the 2022 Journal Citation Reports, the journal has a 2022 impact factor of 2.820.

Editors in Chief
 2014-present: Dr Rich Boden  (University of Plymouth)
 2002-2014: Prof. Jeff Cole (University of Birmingham)
 1997-2002: Prof. Fergus 'Gus' Priest (1948–2019, Heriot-Watt University) 
 1991-?: Prof. Charles A. Fewson (1937-2005, University of Glasgow)
 1981-1990: Prof. Edwin A. Dawes (University of Hull)
 1977-1981: Dr David W Tempest (Free University of Amsterdam).

References

External links

English-language journals
Microbiology journals
Oxford University Press academic journals
Publications established in 1997
Monthly journals
Federation of European Microbiological Societies academic journals